Pravind Kumar Jugnauth (born 25 December 1961) is a Mauritian politician serving as the prime minister of Mauritius since January 2017. Jugnauth has been the leader of the Militant Socialist Movement (MSM) party since April 2003. He has held a number of ministerial portfolios and also been Leader of the Opposition.

Early life and education 
Born on 25 December 1961 in La Caverne, a suburb area in Vacoas-Phoenix, Mauritius, Jugnauth was born into a Hindu Yaduvanshi Ahir family. He was born to Anerood Jugnauth, a barrister, and Sarojini Ballah, a schoolteacher. He has an elder sister, Shalini Jugnauth-Malhotra.

After primary schooling at Aryan Vedic, he studied at Royal College Curepipe. He then went on to study law at the University of Buckingham, thus joining the Lincoln's Inn, and became a barrister. He then joined Aix-Marseille University in France where he graduated with a "diploma in civil law."

Family life 
Pravind Jugnauth married Kobita Ramdanee in 1992 and is the father of three daughters: Sonika, Sonali and Sara.

Start of political career 
Pravind Jugnauth entered the political arena in 1987 and officially joined the MSM in 1990.

2000 to 2005

As Minister of Agriculture from 7 September 2000 to 7 October 2003 (under MSM-MMM government), Jugnauth reformed the sugar sector by diversification with the production of ethanol, agricultural rhum, special sugars, electricity generation from bagasse and other high value-added products. Besides production costs were significantly reduced in response to a drop in the protected sugar price under the Sugar Protocol with the European Union. He also negotiated a package for workers under the Voluntary Retirement Scheme which enabled around 8000 workers to retire with cash compensation exceeding 2.5  billion rupees and around 825 arpents of land worth 3  billion rupees.

Jugnauth also encouraged hydroponics and other modern methods of agricultural production as well as agricultural biotechnology research. He created a National Agricultural Biotechnology Institute and Food Technology Laboratory in Mauritius and later launched the Small Planters Welfare Fund. The fund caters to the welfare of planters and their families and provides crop insurance schemes designed to financially support planters whose crops are affected by unfavourable weather conditions.

As Finance Minister from 7 October 2003 to 5 July 2005, Jugnauth reduced taxes on thousands of commodities. He increased subsidies on basic commodities and gave salary compensations well above inflation rates in two successive years. He launched a project to make Mauritius a Duty Free Island.

2005 to 2009
In June 2005 Prime Minister Paul Berenger dissolved the Parliament in preparation for the 2005 General Elections. The Labour-led Alliance Sociale won a total seat of 38 against the MSM-MMM alliance which obtained only 24 seats. Pravind Jugnauth was defeated in his constituency, received 48% of vote and was not elected. 
Paul Berenger became Leader of the Opposition made up of MSM (14 seats) and MMM (10 seats). 
 
In 2006 MP Ashok Jugnauth left the MSM party and formed a new party following a dispute with Pravind Jugnauth regarding the leadership of the party. At that time Pravind was not an elected member of Parliament but still held leadership of the MSM. Nando Bodha the general secretary of the MSM became Leader of the Opposition after the MSM-MMM alliance split up due to Pravind Jugnauth's disapproval of Paul Berenger's request to make Rajesh Bhagwan the Opposition Chief Whip. In 2007 two members of MSM (Joe Lesongard the party's president and Sekar Naidu) left the MSM and swore allegiance to Berenger who became Leader of the Opposition.

2009 By-Elections
Ashok Jugnauth (half-brother of Sir Anerood Jugnauth and uncle of Pravind) had been elected as MSM member of parliament in Constituency No.8 Quartier Militaire and Moka. But he had to resign in November 2008 as the British Privy Council upheld the guilty verdict that the Supreme Court of Mauritius had issued in 2007 following charges of electoral bribery during the campaign leading to the 2015 General Elections. Thus by-elections had to be held in 2009. Ashok Jugnauth stood as a candidate with the support of MMM. The Labour Party supported Pravind Jugnauth who then announced his candidacy in the 8th constituency. On 2 March 2009, Pravind Jugnauth won the by-elections. His victory paved the way for the next alliance (Labour Party-MSM) during the 2010 general elections.

2009-2014
In 2009, MSM formed a coalition known as Alliance de L'Avenir or Ptr-MSM-PMSD by joining forces with the Mauritian Labour Party and Mauritian Social Democrat Party. The coalition won the May 2010 elections. On Navin Ramgoolam's advice, President Sir Anerood Jugnauth then appointed Jugnauth Vice Prime Minister & Minister of Finance as of 11 May 2010. On 26 July 2011 Jugnauth and all other MSM ministers resigned due to the scandal known as the MedPoint Affair.

In 2014, following the resignation of Paul Berenger as Leader of the Opposition, President Kailash Purryag appointed Jugnauth to the office. Jugnauth served as Leader of the Opposition from September to December 2014.

2014-2017
He was appointed Minister of Information Technology following the Alliance Lepep's victory.

2017-2019

On 23 January 2017, he was chosen by his party MSM to lead the National Assembly. This triggered the ruling coalition partner Parti Mauricien Social Démocrate to leave the government and join the Opposition. Pravind Jugnauth served as Prime Minister of Mauritius during the second half of the Alliance Lepep's mandate which concluded with general elections in November 2019.

2019–present
Following the victory of the Alliance Morisien (a coalition of MSM-ML-MAG parties) at the 2019 General Elections Pravind Jugnauth was elected as Prime Minister for a five-year mandate.

The sovereignty of the Chagos Archipelago in the Indian Ocean is disputed between the United Kingdom and Mauritius. In February 2019, the International Court of Justice in The Hague ruled that the United Kingdom must transfer the islands to Mauritius as they were illegally separated from the latter in 1965. The UK does not recognise Mauritius' sovereignty claim over the Chagos Archipelago. In October 2020, Jugnauth described the British and American governments as "hypocrites" and "champions of double talk" over their response to the dispute.

Recognition and awards

Pravind Jugnauth was honoured Doctor from the University of Buckingham with an Honoris Causa in 2005. In 2017 he has awarded the Pravasi Bharatiya Samman by the President of India.

Controversies
In 2010, the PTR-MSM-PMSD government acknowledged the need to create a specialized centre for geriatric care. Thus the cabinet of Ministers approved the purchase of the existing MedPoint Private Clinic which was owned by Dr. Krishnan Malhotra and Mrs Shalini Devi Jugnauth-Malhotra. The latter is the sister of then Minister of Finance Pravind Jugnauth and daughter of then President Sir Anerood Jugnauth. The objective was to convert the hospital into a specialised centre.

On 22 July 2011 following an investigation by the Independent Commission Against Corruption (ICAC), then Minister of Health Maya Hanoomanjee was arrested by the ICAC Police and the government chief valuer was suspended from his duties. Pravind Jugnauth was also arrested on charges of "conflict of interest". This became known as the MedPoint Affair. On 30 June 2015 Jugnauth was found guilty under Article 13 of the Prevention Of Corruption Act 2002 (PoCA). He was sentenced by the Intermediate court of Mauritius for 1 year of imprisonment. However, he appealed to the Supreme Court of Mauritius and won his appeal. The prosecution appealed to the UK Privy Council which is constitutionally Mauritius' Highest Appeal Court, but the prosecution appeal was ultimately unsuccessful.

On 26 December 2012 Pravind Jugnauth was arrested and interrogated by Central CID on charges of sedition. This followed a complaint lodged by former minister Sheila Bappoo of the Labour Party after Pravind Jugnauth's revelations about the abuse of power and financial scandals involving Navin Ramgoolam's girlfriend Nandanee Soornack. Pravind Jugnauth's arrest was decried as being arbitrary and a form of harassment by Navin Ramgoolam, as the previous application of the anti-sedition law dated back to 1972. Lawyer Roshi Bhadain assisted Pravind Jugnauth in his legal defence.

References

1961 births
Children of national leaders
Government ministers of Mauritius
Deputy Prime Ministers of Mauritius
Living people
20th-century Mauritian lawyers
Mauritian Hindus
Mauritian politicians of Indian descent
Members of the National Assembly (Mauritius)
Militant Socialist Movement politicians
People from Plaines Wilhems District
University of Provence alumni
Prime Ministers of Mauritius
Vice Prime Ministers of Mauritius
Ministers of Finance of Mauritius
Defense ministers of Mauritius
Interior ministers of Mauritius
Recipients of Pravasi Bharatiya Samman